Hysteria used colloquially means ungovernable emotional excess and can refer to a temporary state of mind or emotion.

Hysteria or Histeria may also refer to:

Music
Hysteria (The Human League album), a 1984 album
Hysteria (Def Leppard album), a 1987 album
"Hysteria" (Def Leppard song), a 1987 song
"Hysteria" (Muse song), a 2003 song
"Hysteria" (Anna Abreu song), a 2011 song
Hysteria (Katharine McPhee album), a 2015 album
Hysteria, a 2020 album by Chihiro Onitsuka

Film and television 
Hysteria (1965 film), a British film directed by Freddie Francis
Hysteria (1997 film), a British-Canadian film directed by Rene Daalder
Hysteria (2011 film), a British film directed by Tanya Wexler

Other uses
Hysteria (periodical), a British feminist publication
Hysteria (play), by Terry Johnson, 1993
Hysteria Reinw., a synonym of Corymborkis, an orchid genus
Hysteria, a fictional organism in the TV program Extraterrestrial
Hysteria, a comedy show series for the Terrence Higgins Trust

See also

Histeria (disambiguation)
Hysteresis, the dependence of the state of a system on its history
Hysteron proteron, a rhetorical device
Four discourses, a concept by Jacques Lacan, including "Hysteric"
Mass psychogenic illness, or mass hysteria
Studies on Hysteria, an 1895 book by Sigmund Freud